The academic position of Director, Cambridge University Botanic Garden was created in 1921.

Directors 
 Humphrey Gilbert-Carter (1921)
 John Gilmour (1951)
 Max Walters (1973)
 Donald Pigott (1984)
 John Parker (1996)
 Tim Upson (Acting) (2010)
 Beverley Glover (2013)

References

Bibliography 

 
 

Botanic Garden, Director